Samuel Miller Quincy (1832–1887) was the 28th mayor of New Orleans and a Union Army officer during the American Civil War.

Biography
Samuel Miller Quincy was born in Boston on June 13, 1832, the son of Josiah Quincy, Jr., former mayor of Boston, and the younger brother of Josiah Phillips Quincy. He was a distant cousin of President John Quincy Adams and a descendant of Rev. George Phillips, who settled in Watertown, Massachusetts, in 1630.

He was also a Harvard graduate (1852), lawyer and legal historian, and Union soldier in the American Civil War, during which he was wounded, captured, imprisoned, and exchanged. 

Shortly after the attack on Fort Sumter, Quincy was commissioned a captain in the 2nd Massachusetts Infantry Regiment on May 25, 1861. He was promoted to major on October 22, 1862, and to colonel on January 18, 1863. He resigned his commission on June 5, 1863, but was re-commissioned as the lieutenant colonel of the 73rd United States Colored Infantry Regiment on November 29, 1863, and was promoted to colonel in command of the regiment on May 29, 1864. He served briefly as Mayor of New Orleans from May 5 to June 8, 1865.  

He transferred to the 96th US Colored Infantry Regiment on September 27, 1865, and was mustered out on January 21, 1866, and became the colonel of the 81st US Colored Infantry the next day. He was honorably mustered out of service on November 30, 1866.

On February 21, 1866, President Andrew Johnson nominated Quincy for the award of the honorary grade of brevet brigadier general, United States Volunteers, to rank from March 13, 1865, for gallant and meritorious services during the war, The U.S. Senate confirmed the award on May 18, 1866. 

He was a member of the Massachusetts Commandery of the Military Order of the Loyal Legion of the United States.

General Quincy died in Keene, New Hampshire on March 24, 1887.

See also
 1872 Massachusetts legislature

Notes

References
Eicher, John H. and Eicher, David J. Civil War High Commands. Stanford, CA: Stanford University Press, 2001. .
Hunt, Roger D. and Brown, Jack R. Brevet Brigadier Generals in Blue, p. 496. Gaithersburg, MD: Olde Soldier Books, Inc., 1990. .

External links
 

1832 births
1887 deaths
Harvard University alumni
Mayors of New Orleans
Phillips family (New England)
Quincy family
People of Massachusetts in the American Civil War
Politicians from Quincy, Massachusetts
Union Army colonels